"Goin' Places" is a song written by Gamble and Huff and recorded by The Jacksons for their twelfth album of the same name. Released as a single a few weeks after the album was released, it peaked at #52 on the Billboard Hot 100 on November 12, 1977.

Music video
The music video focused on scenes between the brothers performing on stage and playing around New York City. Locations in the video included Central Park and the Statue of Liberty.

Charts

References

External links
Genius: Goin' Places - Lyrics

1977 singles
1977 songs
The Jackson 5 songs
Songs written by Kenny Gamble
Songs written by Leon Huff
Epic Records singles
Philadelphia International Records singles